Fabrice Hybert, also known by the pseudonym Fabrice Hyber, is a French plastic artist born on 12 July 1961 in Luçon (Vendée). At 56, he was elected to the Academy of Fine Arts on April 25, 2018.

Attached to nature, economics, commerce and science, he has created systems around artistic production with companies, scientists and laboratories around the world. Renowned artist, he works in many diverse ways - accumulating, proliferating, hybridizating - sliding between painting, sculpture, installation and video.

Biography
After a childhood in Vendée, Fabrice Hyber studied mathematics and physics. From 1979 to 1985, he was trained at the Nantes School of Arts. In 1981, he produced his first painting, the Square meter of lipstick, and exhibited in 1984 at the International Drawing Biennial of Saint-Étienne and in 1986 during the International Workshops of the Pays de la Loire at the Royal Abbey of Fontevraud. That same year, he presented his first personal exhibition, "Mutation", at Nantes.

Since 1986, he presents personal exhibitions in Montreal, Limoges, Poitiers, Strasbourg, Tokyo, New York, San Francisco, Zurich, Bruges, Sète or Guadalajara.

In 2000 he was entrusted with a project on the Arc de Triomphe. In 2001, Sidaction commissioned him for a monumental work,  L'Artère , installed in the Parc de la Villette and to which he devoted himself from 2002 to 2006. In 2007, it was in the Jardin du Luxembourg that he installs  The Scream, the Written , a public commission commemorating the abolition of slavery. At the same time, he continues a process launched around 1990 by sowing trees in his childhood valley.

Developing his experiments and artistic works, Fabrice Hyber sets up a sculpture garden in Japan, another in Texas. He also collaborates with the architectural firm Jakob + MacFarlane for the Euronews headquarters in Lyon (2015). In 2018, Fabrice Hyber delivered the painted decoration for the glass roof of the Parisian palace Lutetia, he also produced, for Beaupassage, "Les Deux Chênes" from the double molding of a three-hundred-years-old tree from its Vendée valley.

Officer in the French Order of Arts and Letters since January 2012, Fabrice Hyber was elected to the Fine Arts Academy in 2018.

In 2021, Fabrice Hyber becomes ambassador of the “ONF-Agir pour la forêt” fund (National Forests Office (France)).

On March 7, 2022, Fabrice Hyber was appointed Chairman of the Board of Directors of the Center National des Arts Plastiques (France) by order of the Minister of Culture.

Works
A prolific artist, Fabrice Hyber gradually builds a production made up of paintings, charcoal drawings, collages, videos, etc.

Hybert has suggested that his work explores ‘the enormous reservoir of the possible’ (Eyestorm 2007) via a deconstruction of language and communication. To this end he deploys a very wide range of media for the purpose of expanding the range of his creative practice, deconstructing language in order to present the viewer with puzzles. He abjures the coherent, instantly understandable, text and the consistent oeuvre in favour of a proliferation that reflects the fundamentally nonlinear character of cognition. This is art in the tradition of the Surrealist object and stream of consciousness. It is more akin to James Joyce's Finnegans Wake than it is to classic narrative, it is Dionysian rather than Apollonian.

On the other hand, some of his projects look like exercises in visual language, his square football is not especially bewildering. It is quite simply a functional object that is turned into an ideal form (the cube). His idealised, cubed football maps onto the  horror of function that characterises post-Duchampian fine art that rose into dominance in the international art world in the 1960s. Fabrice ironically refers to such functionless objects as Prototypes d'objects en fonctionnement (prototypes of working objects), or POF. Another instance of connecting the previously unconnected (cf. Simon Starling) is Hyber's Swing (POF No 3), 1990. This is a playground swing with the addition of ‘two phallic protuberances on the seat, one hard, one soft’ (Eyestorm 2007).

Another work Roof-Ceiling (POF No 10), 1995, consists of a mechanical device which vacuums up the rubbish in a room and deposits it in a transparent ceiling overhead; installed in a hairdressing salon, it allows the viewer's newly sheared locks to become part of the architecture. ‘(Eyestorm 2007). This work is not only a demonstration of creative cognition it is also a valuable excursion of fine art outside the museum and into everyday life. Hyber is one of the artists that Nicolas Bourriaud included in his account of so-called relational art which is to say art that engages with people and everyday life (Bourriaud 2002). He also writes.

Golden Lion at the Venice Biennale in 1997, he created a multifaceted work from the practice of painting. Artist in dialogue, he has collaborated with companies, launched the Organoide program at the Institut Pasteur, and since 2012 has been developing the production network "the directors".

Art and sciences 

Sensitive to biology, astronomy or even mathematics and physics, Fabrice Hyber transposes the scientific question into his work, both through the subjects treated and by exposing the creative process, like research tables. The Homeopathic Paintings by Fabrice Hyber highlight the body, the landscape or the object, echoing the act of creation which is explained from beginning to end. Thus, calculations, research documents, sketches, or the artist's moods are constitutive of each work as much they are the visible matrix.

Fabrice Hybert seeks to work with the scientific community. In 2007, for example, he collaborated with the American biotechnologist Robert S. Langer on the issue of stem cells, or, regularly, with the Institut Pasteur and the Professor Olivier Schwartz. Often present in Fabrice Hyber's work, viral notions are also bring up by the artist during the COVID-19 crisis.

The reality of environmental issues is also salient in the work of Fabrice Hyber. Sowing trees in his Vendée valley, he devotes part of his work to researching ecosystems in several parts of the world. The place of renewable energies and electrical uses is also at the heart of its thinking.

Art and business 

Artist and entrepreneur, Fabrice Hyber established partnerships with companies from the start of his career. When he created the Square Meter of lipstick in 1981, he developed a project with the cosmetics manufacturer Liliane France. Since then, he has increased collaborations with private companies.

Emblematic of this work, the largest soap in the world was created in 1991. With the Compagnie des Détergents et du Savon de Marseille, it produced a 22-tons molded soap approved by Guinness Records. An artistic, performative and industrial object, the Biggest soap in the world is also a commercial act insofar as, in partnership with the Édouard Leclerc group and LOcation-VEhicule France transport, it travels in supermarket car parks throughout France and then in Belgium, Germany and Spain. Mentioned in the book 1-1 = 2, trade is important for Fabrice Hyber, especially in that it is to be considered as a means of exchange and not just as a strictly economic element.

Wishing to forge partnerships with private companies and to maintain a form of independence in his projects, their production and their distribution, Fabrice Hyber founded the SARL UR: Unlimited Responsibility in 1994. Used by Fabrice Hyber, the SARL UR is also open to other creators. So little present, at that time, in artistic circles, the entrepreneurial question is seen there as the object of encounters and experiments as much as of production. Taking up the trade codes (promotion, communication, sale), in particular by marketing POFs, one of UR's objectives is the funding of artistic projects.

In 1995, the Musée d'Art moderne de Paris presented the Hybertmarché exhibition in collaboration with the University of Lünebourg. Involving the UR company, the project consists of: having an inventory of objects present in Hyber's work, ordering or sending them, receiving them and placing them on the shelf publicly after the opening of the exhibition, modifying them according to what they are in his mind, putting them on sale.

Among other projects in partnership with companies, Fabrice Hyber is helping to develop the Frisson d'Hyber gin in 2021 with the company Conquérant Spirits.

In March 2022, he collaborated with luxury leather goods designer Camille Fournet and created a limited and numbered edition capsule of products using his Hyber green.

Selection of projects

The POFs
Born in 1991, POFs (Prototypes of in operation objects) are inspired by everyday life. Hybrid, absurd, subversive and yet very close to everyday objects, POFs start from reality and slide it towards the point where logical perception is undermined. Conceived as invitations to the appropriation and diversion of the ordinary, the POFs are initially marketed by UR and can be made by each person according to an indication given by Fabrice Hyber. By questioning his daily life or by fabricating, the viewer becomes a stakeholder in the work. The Endless Staircase, the Swing or the Square Balloon are among the most emblematic of the 160 POFs created since 1991.

In 2018, the Maison des POF was created as part of the percent for art for the new building of the Nantes Art School. A place of experimentation, the Maison des POF is an evolving firm that invites the public to manipulate, try and question themselves.

L’Homme de Bessines
Responding to a public commission for the town of Bessines (Deux-Sèvres), Fabrice Hyber undertakes to disperse six bronze men painted green in the village. At a height of 87 cm, half the size of the artist, each sculpture is pierced by eleven holes from which jets of water shoot out. In connection with the notion of mutation treated by the artist in 1986, L'Homme de Bessines is also a viral work because it is intended to be distributed indefinitely. Thus, since the first installation in Bessines in 1991, the sculpture has been reproduice in several hundred copies, of varying sizes and appearances, all over the planet. In 2022, the thirtieth anniversary of the Homme de Bessines is the occasion for an installation in the gardens of the Palais Royal in Paris.

Eau d’or, eau dort, Odor and Spiral TV 
Invited to use the French pavilion at the 47th Venice Biennale in 1997, Fabrice Hyber transforms space into a place of creation in permanent change and not into a place of presentation of works of art. Named Eau d'Or, Eau Dort, Odor, the event transforms the French pavilion into an experimental filming studio with the participation of various personalities (Albert Jacquard, Jean Rouch, Uri Tzaig, made in Eric, etc.) and the public. Live or recorded, the programs copied and transgress television codes while placing the question of the body at the center of the project. For Fabrice Hyber, the creation process is then more important than the final product. Noticed, the project earned the artist the award of a Golden Lion.

In 1999, it was at the Wacoal Art Center in Tokyo that Fabrice Hyber developed a proposal according to the Venetian device. Through Spiral TV, the artist produces and broadcasts live (on cable and internet), twelve hours of daily programs under the name "It's Tomorrow Now", for five days.

Inconnu.net
From September to November 2000, Fabrice Hybert invests the Arc de Triomphe and its surroundings as part of a national demonstration confident seven national monuments to seven artists. Wishing to create a green setting around the monument, Fabrice Hyber deploys a belt of a hundred birch trees in opposition to the mineral character of the place. Changing green lighting is projected onto the Arc de Triomphe while an historical room is dedicated to viewing the inconnu.net website.

Developing the question born from the commemorative tomb of the First World War, Fabrice Hyber transforms the Parisian monument into an open door to the unknown, both through the external device and through the internet portal which invites visitors to ask questions including answers other questions arising from contributions from artists, writers, scientists, etc.

L'Artère, le jardin des dessins

In 2001, to mark the 20th anniversary of the appearance of AIDS, the Sidaction association launched a call for projects for the creation of a commemorative monument. Detached from the aesthetic of commemoration, Fabrice Hyber's project reflects the social, emotional or medical aspects linked to the virus. Spanning 1001 m2, the ensemble is made up of ceramics designed by the artist and produced in Monterrey, Mexico. Produced from 2002 to 2006, the work installed in the Parc de la Villette resembles, by its rhizomatic aspect, a vast storyboard.

Le Cri, L'Écrit

“The cry is mark of the slavery abolition but also a warning against modern slavery. The cry is fear, tears but also joy. The cry is a metaphor for this enslavement which has been abolished by the texts. The cry is a drawing in space; for the garden in front of the Senate, a writing was needed! The abolition of slavery is the open chain ring, the closed ring is that everything can start again, and the base is the return to the roots, but it is also the Earth which is an hindering... "

Announced in 2006 by President Chirac, the commission for a public work dedicated to the abolition of slavery was entrusted to Fabrice Hyber. Inaugurated in 2007, the 3.7m high polychrome bronze sculpture represents three chain rings held vertically by golden wedges representing French institutions and the fragility of a situation that can tip over. Dark, one of the faces of the sculpture presents the words "Elsewhere", "Decimated", "Exterminated", "Deported", "Death", "Inhuman", "Slave". The other side reveals a blood system attached to the living.

C’Hyber(t) Rallies
Eager to see art out of museums and centers dedicated, Fabrice Hybert It develops its first Hyber(t) Rally in Tokyo in 2001 - the same year he also exhibited at Watari Hum. Developed since in Vassivière, Paris, Reunion island, Toulon, etc., the device invites spectators to take part in a vast treasure hunt intended to find POFs hidden in everyday spaces.

Adapted to their territory of performance, the C’Hyber(t) Rallies also have the objective of revealing landscapes or human constructions. The search for a work of art outside its traditional location serves as a medium between the place and the people within.

Collections

Public collections (selection) 

 Moca, Los-Angeles
 Paris' Museum of Modern Art
 Pompidou Centre
 MUDAM Grand Duke Jean Museum of Modern Art, Luxembourg
 MuHKA - Antwerp
 Stedelijk Museum voor Actuele Kunst - Ghent
 Museum het Domein, Sittard
 21st Century Museum of Contemporary Art, Kanazawa
 Herzliya Museum of Contemporary Art, Israël
 Fine Arts Museum of Nantes
 Les Sables-d’Olonne's Museum
Frac des Pays de la Loire
 CAPC musée d'art contemporain de Bordeaux
 Musée d'Art contemporain de Lyon
 Musée d'Art Contemporain du Val-de-Marne

Private collections (selection) 

 Carmignac Foundation
 Fondazione Guastalla
 Francès Foundation
 Fondation Maeght
 Bredin Prat Foundation
 Dolorès and Claude Bonan
 Michel Poitevin
 François Meyer
 Masathis
 Guy Savoy
 Maya and Fared Hariri
 Emmanuelle and Jérôme de Noirmont
 Mona Hamilton

Exhibitions

Solo exhibitions 
1986
Mutation, Maison de l’avocat, Nantes, France

1987
 Pollution, Arlogos gallery, Nantes, France  
 Fabrice Hybert, Ussel City House, Ussel, France

1989
 Change, D.R.A.C., Poitiers, France
 Refaire le monde, Caen Municipal Theater, Caen, France 
 Fabrice Hybert, Arlogos gallery, Nantes, France

1990
Fabrice Hybert, Froment-Putman gallery, Paris, France

1991
Fabrice Hybert, Interface gallery, Nîmes, France
 Arlogos gallery, Nantes, France

1992
Les Deux Étages, Art center Le Creux de l’enfer, Thiers, France
Larve d'entreprise, Arlogos gallery, Nantes, France  
Conversation, La Criée Contemporary Art Center, Rennes, France  
 Artsonje center, Séoul, South Corea 
Vis à vis, le miroir des galleries, Liège, Belgium

1993
Fabrice Hybert : œuvres de 1981 à 1993, Contemporary Art Museum C.A.P.C., Bordeaux, France
Programme d'entreprise indéterminée, Fine Arts Museum of Nantes, France

1994
 Fabrice Hybert, Kunstalle Lophem, Bruges, Belgium
 ZenoX Gallery, Antwerp, Belgium
 Contemporary Art Center, Moscow, Russia
500e anniversaire de Rabelais, Le Confort moderne, Poitiers, France

1995
 L'Hybertmarché (1-1=2), Musée d'Art moderne de Paris, France 
 Plus lourd à l'intérieur, Saint-Étienne’s Museum, France  
 Plus lourd à l'intérieur, Strasbourg’s Museum, France  
 Froment-Putman Gallery, Paris, France

1996
 Testoo, Kunstraum Luneburg, Germany
 Testoo, Jack Tilton Gallery, New York, USA 
 EIGEN+ART, Leipzig (D) - Kunsthalle Lophem, Bruges
 Testoo, Vleeshal, Middelburg, Nederland 
 Station u 841 - Berlin, Germany

1997
 25-52, Erna Hecey Gallery, Luxembourg
 Eau d’or, eau dort, ODOR, French pavilion, 47th Venice Biennale, Italy  
 Muster Testoo, Leipzig, Germany 
 Et POF, Arts School, Nantes, France

1998
Diététique, Le Confort moderne, Poitiers, France
Citoxe, De Appel Foundation, Amsterdam, Nederland 
Fabrice Hybert, Kunsthalle Saint Gallen, Switzerland
 Jack Tilton Gallery, New York, USA
Certificat, Kanazawa University, Japan 
Évidemment, Riverin-Arlogos Gallery, Montréal, Canada 
Prix Paris photo 1998, Paris, France

1999
 Spiral TV, it’s tomorrow now, Tokyo, Japan
 At your own risk, CCAC Institute, San Francisco, USA 
 At your own risk, Bergen kunstmuseum, Bergen, Norway
 Bergen’s Museum, Bergen, Norway
 Erna Hécey, Art Fair Basel, Switzerland
 IPM, Art Fair Basel, Switzerland
 Mind map, Eigen+Art Gallery, Berlin, Germany
 Peter Kilchmann Gallery, Zurich, Suisse
 POF shop, Tokyo, Japan

2000
Parpadeantes eyes, Museo de las Artes, Guadalajara, Mexico
 Inconnu.net, Changements de temps, Arc de Triomphe, Paris, France 
 Inconnu.net, Ace Galery, Los Angeles, USA 
 Listaasafn Reykjavik, Reykjavik, Island 
 At your own risk, Porin Taidemuseoon, Pori, Finland  
 At your own risk, Götenborg Kunstmuseum, Göteborg, Sweden
 La Beauté au quotidien de l’Égypte antique", Séphora, Les Champs-Élysées, Paris, France 
 Les Loisirs de Fabrice Hybert, Notre-Dame des Fleurs, Vence, France 
 Kunsthalle Lophem, Bruges, Belgium

2001
 Watari-um, Tokyo, Japan
 Ace Gallery, Mexico, Mexico
 POF, Kunsthalle Lophem, Bruges, Belgium
 C'Hybert, Contemporary Art Center of Vassivière en Limousin, France 
 Tokyo c'hybert rallye - Vassivière c'hybert rallye
 Mex-Mixt, Anne-de-Villepoix Gallery, Paris, France

2002
 Juste après la plage, Dourven Gallery, Trédez-Locquémeau, France 
 POF Cabaret, Kunsthalle Lophem, Bruges, Belgium  
Voix d'eaux, Châteauneuf-en-Auxois, France 
Fabrice Hybert, Jack Tilton Gallery, New York, USA  
Fabrice Hybert, House of the Department, Évreux, France

2003
 Entrejambe – Espace privé/Espace public, Gustave Fayet Space, Sérignan, France
 Les Hommes cellulaires, Carcassonne, France 
 Pof, Pof, Pof, Kunstraum leuphana universitat Lüneburg, Germany

2005
 Météo Villa Arson, Nice, France 
L’Atelier d’hiver d’Hyber, Domaine Pommery, Reims, France
Nord – sud, Frac des Pays de la Loire, Nantes, France 
Fée maison, La Briqueterie, Ciry-le-Noble, Le Creusot, France

2006
 Les Éclats, Herzliya Museum, Tel Aviv, Israël
 Pétrôle, Jérôme de Noirmont Gallery, Paris, France
 Voix d’eaux et +, Bernard Anthonioz Art House, Nogent-sur-Marne, France

2007
 Matière à penser / Food for thought, Le Laboratoire, Paris, France
C’Hyber Rallye de la Réunion, La Réunion island, France

2008
Du pur Hyber, Jérôme de Noirmont Gallery, Paris, France 
Power plants, la puissance des plantes, F-A Ducros Space, Grignan, France  
Seed and Grow Je s'aime.Watari-Um, Tokyo, Japan

2010
 Immortalité Moscow, Nijni Novgorod, Krasnoyarsk, Russia
 Pasteur' Spirit Pasteur Institute, Paris, France

2011
Inventions, Jérôme de Noirmont Gallery, Paris, France

2012
Matières premières Palais de Tokyo, Paris, France
 POF, Prototype d'objets en fonctionnent, MAC VAL, Vitry-sur-Seine, France 
 Essentiel Maeght Foundation, Saint-Paul-de-Vence, France

2013
Raw materials, Baltic Centre for contemporary art, Newcastle, England
 Essentiel peintures homéopathiques, Maeght Foundation, Saint-Paul-de-Vence, France

2014
 Interdit aux enfants, Nathalie Obadia Gallery, Paris, France  
 Homeopathic paintings, der Stadt Tuttlingen Gallery, Tuttlingen, Germany

2015
 Mutations acquises, Galerie Nathalie Obadia, Brussels, Belgium
 Forme des mots, M HKA, Antwerp, Belgium 
, CRAC Languedoc Roussillon, Sète, France

2016
L'Homme Éponge, MUP IDF, Bondy/Cachan/Boulogne-Billancourt, France
 « L’entier » par Fabrice Hyber, Cyrille Putman et galerie quatre, Arles, France

2020
 Habiter la forêt, Nathalie Obadia Gallery, Paris, France
Fabrice Hyber, Telmah Gallery, Rouen, France

2021
Frisson d'Hyber, Gilles Drouault, galerie/multiples, Paris, France
Fresh Air, RX gallery, New-York, United States 
L'Artère 2021, La Villette, Paris, France

2022

Limited Edition hyberFournet, Camille Fournet’s shop, Paris, France
L'Homme de Bessines, Palais Royal, Paris, France
POF, Lasécu, Lille, France

Collective exhibitions (selection) 
1986

 Ateliers internationaux des Pays de la Loire 1986, Royal abbey of Fontevraud, Fontevraud, France

1987

 1st international Istanbul Contemporary Art Exhibitions, Ankara, Istanbul, Turkey

1990

 Espaces internationaux, CREDAC, Ivry-sur-Seine, France
 Des ateliers, une collection du FRAC des Pays de la Loire, FRAC Auvergne, Clermont-Ferrand, France
 Baquié-Faure-Hybert, Arlogos Gallery, Nantes, France
 Ateliers de la fondation Cartier, Cartier Foundation, Paris, France

1991

 Les Couleurs de l'argent, La Poste's Museum, Paris, France
 Collection du CAPC musée : Absalon, Richard Fauguet, Fabrice Hybert, Didier Marcel, CAPC-Contemporary Art Museum, Bordeaux, France

1992

 Périls et Colères, CAPC-Contemporary Art Museum, Bordeaux, France
 Il faut construire l'hacienda, C.C.C, Tours, France 
 France troisième génération Exposition internationale, Séville, Spain

1993

 Nouveaux Augures, FRAC Languedoc-Roussillon, Montpellier, France
 L'Image dans le tapis, Arsenale, Venice, Italy
 L'Autre à Montevideo, Museo Nacional de Artes Visuales, Montevideo, Uruguay
 Eros, c'est la vie, Le Confort moderne, Poitiers, France 
 Chambre 763, Carlton Palace, Paris, France

1994

 This is the show and the show is many things, Museum van Hedendaagse kunst, Ghent, Belgium
 Hors-limites, Centre Georges Pompidou, Paris, France
 Cloaca maxima, Museum der Stadtenwässerung, Zurich, Switzerland

1995

 Take me I'm yours, Serpentine Gallery, London, England
 Shift, De Appel, Amsterdam, Nederland 
 Maisons-cerveaux, FRAC Champagne Ardenne, Reims, France 
 Le Dépeupleur, Froment Putman Gallery, Paris, France
 Laboratoires, Damien Hirst, Fabrice Hybert, Kiki Smith, Patrick Van Caeckenberg, pour une expérience du corps, Art et Essai Gallery (Rennes 2 University), Rennes, France 
 Féminin Masculin le sexe de l'art, Centre Georges-Pompidou, Paris, France
 Biennale de Kwangju, Kwangju, South Corea

1996

 We (Fabrice Hybert et Uri Tzaig), musée d'Israël, Jérusalem, Israël
 Collection : Absalon, Hyber, Mouillé, CAPC-Contemporary Art Museum, Bordeaux, France
 Cabines de bain, La Motta swimming pool, Fribourg, Switzerland

1997

 Kunst in der stadt, Kunstverein, Bregenz, Austria
 Fenêtre sur cour, Almine Rech Gallery, Paris, France
 Do it, New-York, USA
 Connexions implicites, École nationale supérieure des beaux-arts, Paris, France
 Biennale de Kwangju, Kwangju, South Corea
 47th Venice Biennale; Eau d'or, eau dort, ODOR Venice – France pavilion, Italy

1998

 Tu parles/J'écoute, Fine arts museum, Taipei, Taïwan
 To the living room, Watari-um museum, Tokyo, Japan
 Premises, Guggenheim, New-York, USA
 Métissages, Musée du Luxembourg, Paris, France 
 Jef Geys-Fabrice Hybert, Z33, Hasselt, Belgium
 Indoor, Centro civico La Grancia, Rapolano, Italy
 H2O, Erna Hécey Gallery, Luxembourg
 Cet et été là... Exposition des variétés, CRAC, Sète, France

1999

 Spiral TV it's tomorrow now (3e édition du festival art life), Spiral, Tokyo, Japan 
 Picnic, Museo de las artes, Guadalajara, Mexico
 Passage, new french art, Hiroshima - MOCA / Sapporo - Hokkaido museum of modern art / Tokyo - Setagaya museum, Japan 
 Made in France, Artsonje center, Séoul, South Corea
 Indoor, musée des beaux-arts, Lyon, France

2000

 Voilà le monde dans la tête, Museum of Modern Art, Paris, France
 Passage, new french art, City museum, Nagoya, Japan
 Narcisse blessé, autoportraits contemporains, Passage de Retz, Paris, France
 La Ville, le Jardin, la Mémoire, Villa Médicis, Rome, Italy
 Air air, celebrating inflatables, Grimaldi forum, Monaco

2001

 Somewhere over the rainbow, FRAC Normzndie, Sotteville-lès-Rouen, France
 Simulacres et Détournements dans les années 1980 et 90, CAPC-Contemporary Art Museum, Bordeaux, France
 Le Ludique, Québec's Museum, Québec, Canada

2002

 Objets de réflexion, FRAC Ile-de-France / Le plateau, Paris, France

2003

 Trésors publics 20 ans de création dans les Fonds régionaux d'art contemporain. L'État des choses. L'Objet dans l'art de 1960 à aujourd'hui, Fine arts museum, Nantes, France
 Sexe, sexe, etc., Galerie Beaubourg, Château Notre-dame-des-Fleurs, France 
 Pour l'amour de Vénus, Donjon de Vez, France 
 Les 20 ans des FRAC, Fine arts museum, Nantes, France
 Le Ludique, Modern Art Museum, Villeneuve-d'Ascq, France

2004

 Mix Max, Artsonje center, Séoul, South Korea 
 L'Art à la plage, Ramatuelle, France
 Frantisek Kupka, Musée Fabre, Montpellier, France
F2004@Shanghai, Année de la France en Chine, La Fabrique, Shanghai

2005

 Supernova, Domaine Pommery, Reims, France
 Météo, Villa Arson, Nice, France
 Dionysiac, Centre Georges Pompidou, Paris, France 
 3rd world ceramix biennale, Incheon, South Corea

2006

 We Humans are Free : from the collection of SMAK, The 21st century museum of contemporary art, Kanazawa, Japan
 Une proposition de Mathieu Mercier, FRAC Basse-Normandie, Caen, France 
 Peinture Malerei, Martin-Gropius-Bau, Berlin, Germany
 L'Art à la plage, Ramatuelle, France
 La Force de l'art, Grand Palais, Paris, France

2007

 Suite française, Institut français, Wien, Austria
 Rouge Baiser, Hangar à bananes, Nantes, France
 Le Musée côté jardin, Art and History Museum, Saint-Brieuc, France 
 Estuaire, Canal Saint Felix, France 
 Airs de Paris, Centre Georges Pompidou, Paris, France

2008

 Sens dessus dessous, CRAC Languedoc-Roussillon, Sète, France
 Mobile Art Chanel, New York; Tokyo; Hong Kong

2009

 Métissages, Baron-Gérard Museum, Bayeux, France 
 La Force de l'art, Grand Palais, Paris, France
 Collection Florence et Daniel Guerlain, Guerlain Foundation, Les Mesnuls, France

2010

 Nos meilleurs souvenirs, Domaine Pommery, Reims, France 
 Métissages, Hôtel Hèbre de Saint-Clément, Rochefort, France
 L'Expérience du monde, Contemporary art center, Moscow, Russia
 Le Sourire du chat (opus 1), Hangar à bananes, Nantes, France 
 Le Mont analogue, Centro cultural metropolitano, Quito, Ecuador
 Circuit céramique à Sèvres. La Scène française contemporaine, Sèvres Manufacture, Sèvres, France
 Biennale de Lodz, Lodz, Poland

2011

 Paris, Delhi, Bombay, Centre Georges Pompidou, Paris, France
 Inquiétantes Étrangetés, Fine Arts Museum Nantes, France
 Dessins exquis, Slick, Paris, France
 Already-made, Jérôme de Noirmont Gallery, Paris, France

2012

 To be with art is all we ask, Astrup Fearnley Museet, Oslo, Norway
 Retour à l'intime la collection Giuliana et Tommaso Setari, La Maison rouge, Paris, France
 L'Âne musicien (Déchire tout et recommence), FRAC Languedoc-Roussillon, Montpellier, France
 Estuaire, Canal Saint Felix, France
 Camere 17, Roma, Italy
 Abu Dhabi Art's Arts, Talks and sensations, Abu Dhabi

2013

 Poétique d'objets, Lieu d'art et d'action contemporaine, Dunkirk, France 
 La Tyrannie des objets Galeries Lafayette, Galerie des galleries, Paris, France
 La Donation Florence et Daniel Guerlain, Centre Georges Pompidou, Paris, France
 Entre-temps... Brusquement et ensuite (12e biennale de Lyon), Lyon, France
 De Chaissac à Hyber, Historial de la Vendée, Les Lucs-sur-Boulogne, France

2014

 Procession, CAPC-Contemporary Art Museum, Bordeaux, France
 L'Image dans l'onde, Fondation François-Schneider, Wattwiller, France
 Le Mur. La collection Antoine de Galbert, La Maison rouge, Paris, France 
 Donaugalerie ein skulpturenprojekt der stadt Tuttlingen, Tuttlingen, Germany
 Brave new world, Metropolitan museum, Manille, Philippines 
 Biennale de Busan 2014 : Habiter le monde, Busan, South Corea

2015

 Take me I'm yours, La Monnaie, Paris, France
 Cosa mentale, Centre Georges-Pompidou, Metz, France 
 CONTOUR 7 biennale voor bewegend beeld a moving image biennale in Mechelen, Mechelen, Belgium

2016

 PAD Paris Art Design, France - Paris – Tuileries Garden

2019

 Coup de foudre, with Nathalie Talec,  Foundation EDF, Paris
 Nous les arbres, Cartier Foundation 

2020Les Extatiques, Paris la Défense, FranceNotre monde brûle, Palais de Tokyo, Paris, FranceHabiter la forêt, Obadia Gallery Paris, France

2021Napoléon ? Encore !, Army Museum (Paris), Paris, FranceTrees, Power Station of Art, Shanghai, Chine

2022Vous êtes un arbre, Les Franciscaines, Deauville, France

 References 

 Appendices 
 Bibliography 
 Monographs 
 Frederic Bougle, 1-1 = 2 Entretiens avec Fabrice Hybert, Nantes, Éditions Joca Seria, 1992-1994
 Pascal Rousseau, Fabrice Hybert, Paris, Hazan, 1999
 Guy Tortosa, POF HYBERT, Paris, UR éditions, 1999
 Thierry Laurent, Il est interdit de mourir, Paris, Au même titre éditions, 2003
 Fabrice Hyber, Richesses, Paris, Éditions Jannink, 2004
 Bernard Marcadé, Baert de Baere, Pierre Giquel, Hyber, Paris, Flammarion, 2009.
 Philippe Forest, Bernard Marcadé, Olivier Schwartz, Yves Jammet, L'Artère - Le Jardin des dessins, Nantes, Éditions Cécile Defaut, 2009.
 Gilles Coudert, Alice Dautry, Pascal Rousseau, Olivier Schwartz, Fabrice Hyber Sans gêne livre DVD, Paris, Après éditions, 2012.
 Donatien Grau, Hans Ulrich Obrist, Hyber… Hyber, Paris, Bernard Chauveau éditeur, 2014.

 Catalogs of personal exhibitions 
 Pierre Giquel, Fabrice Hybert Mutation, Nantes, La Maison de l'avocat, 1986.
 Guy Tortosa, Pierre Giquel, Fabrice Hybert, Direction régionale des affaires culturelles du Limousin, 1987.
 Jean-Louis Froment, Pierre Giquel, Catherine Strasser, Fabrice Hybert, œuvres de 1981 à 1993, CapcMusée d'Art contemporain de Bordeaux, 1993.
 Bernard Ceysson, Friedemann Malsch, Plus lourd à l'intérieur, Éditions du musée d'Art moderne de Saint-Étienne, 1995.
 Jean-Pierre Changeur, Alice Dautry, Annick Perrot, Olivier Schwartz, Fabrice Hyber à l'Institut Pasteur, Paris, Institut Pasteur, 2010.
 Jacqueline Frydman, Pascal Rousseau, Fabrice Hyber, Moscow, Maison de la photographie de Moscou, 2010.
 Nicolas Setari, POF Prototypes d'objets en fonctionnement 1991-2012, Vitry-sur-Seine, MAC VAL, 2012.
 Olivier Kaeppelin, Bernard Marcadé, Pascal Rousseau, Essentiel peintures homéopathiques'', Saint-Paul de Vence, Fondatien Maeght, 2012.

Others 
 Bourriaud, Nicolas. 2002. Relational aesthetics, Documents sur l'art. Dijon: Les presses du réel.

External links
Hybert's website
Hybert's gallery
Peintures homéopathiques by Fabrice Hybert

1961 births
Living people
People from Luçon
Academic staff of the École des Beaux-Arts
French contemporary artists